António Sapalo Lohoca Justo, best known as "Paty", is an Angolan footballer who plays as a midfielder for Interclube.

External links 
 

Living people
1990 births
Académica Petróleos do Lobito players
G.D. Interclube players
Girabola players
Association football midfielders
Angolan footballers
Angola international footballers
Angola A' international footballers
2018 African Nations Championship players